The X class is a metre gauge 0-8-2RT rack and pinion compound locomotive used by the Nilgiri Mountain Railway in the Nilgiri Hills of southern India. They are used on the  section between Coonoor and Mettupalayam, where the steepest gradient is 1 in 12.5. The railway uses the Abt system on these steep sections. The locomotives have two high-pressure and two low-pressure cylinders, located outside the locomotive's frames. The low-pressure cylinders drive the rack gears, and are positioned above the two main high-pressure cylinders which drive the main wheels.

This class of engine was acquired to replace the line's original Beyer, Peacock and Company 2-4-0RT rack locomotives, which were not powerful enough to handle the traffic. The X-class locomotives were bought in two batches from the Swiss Locomotive and Machine Works, Winterthur, Switzerland. The first batch of 12 was delivered between 1914 and 1925, and the second batch of five was delivered in 1952. Four more members of the class were built in India between 2011 and 2014. Two more were Again built in India between 2021 and 2022

Class Table

Conversion to oil 

The coal-fired Locomotive No. 37395 was modified to oil firing in 2002, and another locomotive was similarly modified shortly afterwards. The railway intends to convert more locomotives to oil-fired system, since they are less likely to spark forest fires and are easier to refuel. Unlike coal-fired engines which require two firemen, only one fireman needs to travel with the driver of an oil-fired locomotive. Now all Oil-Fired steam engines run on High Speed Diesel, owing to Lesser Sulphur content and Lesser Viscosity compared to Furnace Oil

New locomotives 
To ease the load on existing X-class locomotives, four oil-fired X-Class 0-8-2RT rack and pinion compound engine steam locomotives with a similar design were ordered. The first one (No. X 37396), named "Neela Kurinji" arrived in February 2011 and entered service on March 24 of that year. The second one (X 37397), named "Betta Queen" was rolled out at the Golden Rock Railway Workshop in February 2012, and entered service on the railway in March. The third one built by Golden Rock, Trichy (X 37398), named "Nilgiri Queen", entered service in March 2013. The fourth (X 37399), named "Nilgiri Flycatcher" was rolled out on March 5, 2014 at the Central Workshop in Ponmalai, Tiruchirapalli, to join the fleet after trials on the railway.

In 2020, under Central Govt's order, Ponmalai Goldenrock (G.O.C.) started manufacture of one coal-powered and one oil-powered X-Class Steam Engine, But due to COVID-19, lockdown etc, could not finish and roll out on time (Source:- Deccan Herald). X-37400 (NMR no. 22), the Coal-powered locomotive, was rolled finally out on August 25, 2021 and is now in Service. Oil (aka High Speed Diesel) Fired locomotive X-37401 (NMR no. 23) rolled out recently, on September 26 2022 and also has joined service

In fiction
Ashima, a character based on the X Class and voiced by Tina Desai, appears in the 2016 animated film Thomas & Friends: The Great Race. She also appears in the twenty-second series, the twenty-third series and the twenty-fourth series of Thomas & Friends.

In Bollywood
The X-class Steam Engines were temporarily repainted and used in the song Chayya Chayya, sung by Sukhwinder Singh and Sapna Awasthi, with music composed by A R Rahman and lyrics by Gulzar. This song features Shah Rukh Khan and Malaika Arora dancing on the Train, from the 1998 Mani Ratnam movie Dil Se. For shooting the song, Mani Ratnam spoke to NMR for painting the X-class Steam Engines in Greenish Black Color and the Train Rakes in Brick Color, for 5 days, as the shooting took 108 hours (4.5 days).

References

Notes

Bibliography

External links 

Steam locomotives of India
Compound locomotives
0-8-2T locomotives
SLM locomotives
Rack and cog driven locomotives
Metre gauge steam locomotives
Passenger locomotives
Railway locomotives introduced in 1914